Viviane Marie-Louise Blanche Asseyi (born 20 November 1993) is a French professional footballer who plays as a forward for Women's Super League club West Ham United and the France national team.

Club career
Asseyi began her career with amateur club US Quevilly. Due to Quevilly not having a women's section, she played on a mixed team composed mostly of boys.  She later joined the women's section of football club FC Rouen, where the youngster scored 23 goals in 28 total appearances. She joined Montpellier midway through the 2009–10 season in January 2010 and played there until moving to Olympique de Marseille ahead of the 2016–17 season.

In 2020, amid the COVID-19 pandemic, she transferred to Bayern Munich in Germany. Upon her arrival at the club, she was welcomed by fellow French citizen Benjamin Pavard, who played for the men's side. She had been in conversations with Bayern about a transfer for a year prior to the move.

On 2 August 2022, Asseyi joined Women's Super League club West Ham United.

Personal life
Asseyi was born in France, and is of Gabonese descent.

Career statistics

Club

International 

Scores and results list France's goal tally first, score column indicates score after each Asseyi goal.

Honours
Bayern Munich
Frauen-Bundesliga: 2020-21

References

External links
 
 
 FFF profile 
 Profile at Montpellier HSC 
 Player French football stats at footofeminin.fr 

1993 births
Living people
Black French sportspeople
French sportspeople of Gabonese descent
Footballers from Normandy
Sportspeople from Seine-Maritime
People from Mont-Saint-Aignan
Women's association football midfielders
French women's footballers
France women's youth international footballers
France women's international footballers
Montpellier HSC (women) players
Olympique de Marseille (women) players
FC Girondins de Bordeaux (women) players
FC Bayern Munich (women) players
Division 1 Féminine players
Frauen-Bundesliga players
2019 FIFA Women's World Cup players
French expatriate women's footballers
French expatriate sportspeople in Germany
French expatriate sportspeople in England
Expatriate women's footballers in Germany
Expatriate women's footballers in England
West Ham United F.C. Women players